Istead Rise is a village in the borough of Gravesham in Kent, England,  south of Gravesend. It had a population of 3,437 at the 2011 Census.

The name of the village is not an ancient one; it first appears as a road-name on the Ordnance Survey 25" map of 1907.   At that time Istead Rise was the only road in the region and led to Frog's Island at its western end. The name may be connected to a field-name, Highstead, appearing as plot 690 on the Northfleet tithe award of 1838.

Southeastern commuter trains run on the high-speed track to London St Pancras (16 minutes away), stopping only at Stratford International.

The new Linear Park, on the site of the old A2, is 15 minutes' walk away, 5 minutes by bike, and is suited to cycling, walking and jogging. At the Eastern end is Shorne Country Park. The new Cyclopark opened there in September 2012.

Istead Rise Primary School provides education for children till the age of 11. In addition, on the site of the primary school, there are two nursery schools.

St Barnabas Church (Church of England), founded in 1957, is located near the shops.

There is a small parade of shops with an Indian restaurant, fish and chip shop, butcher, pharmacy, Co-op and dry cleaner. On Lewis Road there are an hairdresser, florist and dentist. There is a GP surgery on Worcester Close.

Istead Rise was a pig-farming community in the 1860s, situated in the North Downs pathway. A pig farm was on what is now the site of Istead Rise Primary School.  Kent County Council bought the site for its school in the 1960s. Until then Istead Rise did not have a school as there were insufficient children in the area to make this viable. As well as a pig farm on Downs Road, there were orchards on what are now the Community Centre fields and the surrounding housing area.  There was also a flower farm with large greenhouses around what is now Flower Hill House and Flowerhill Way.  Frog Island is on the site of what is now Istead Rise Parade.  Frog Island is also the name of the local Morris Men group. References to these can be found in the local history of Istead Rise The Rise of the Rise, by Ken Jones.

Istead Rise community centre was destroyed by a fire started during a burglary on 20 March 2007. The centre was re-built and opened again on 17 December 2008.

References

Villages in Kent